Hrvatske autoceste (HAC) or Croatian Motorways Ltd is a Croatian state-owned limited liability company tasked with management, construction and maintenance of motorways in Croatia pursuant to provisions of the Croatian Public Roads Act enacted by the Croatian Parliament.
Tasks of the company are defined by Public Roads Act and its Founding Declaration, and the principal task of the company is management, construction and maintenance of the motorways. In practice, Hrvatske autoceste is responsible for management or development the following motorway sections:

A8 and A9 highways, part of the "Istrian Y" are operated by BINA Istra, while A2 is operated by Autocesta Zagreb–Macelj.

"Hrvatske autoceste" was established on April 6, 2001, under the law promulgated on April 5, 2001, with the share capital of the company worth 131,140,100.00 Croatian kuna. Hrvatske autoceste is organized in four business sectors: Design; Construction; Financial and Economic Affairs; and Legal and General Affairs. All profits generated by HAC are used for construction and maintenance of the roads the company manages.  the company is currently administered by a two-person managing board consisting of Boris Huzjan (chairman) and Stjepan Baranašić (member of the Board); and five-member supervisory board.

See also 
 Highways in Croatia
 Hrvatske ceste

References

External links 
 

Transport companies established in 2001
Road operators
Construction and civil engineering companies of Croatia
Companies based in Zagreb
Government-owned companies of Croatia
Croatian companies established in 2001
Construction and civil engineering companies established in 2001